Coniston is a village and civil parish in the East Riding of Yorkshire, England, in an area known as Holderness. It lies on the A165 road.

The civil parish is formed by the village of Coniston and the hamlet of Thirtleby.
According to the 2011 UK Census, Coniston parish had a population of 319, an increase on the 2001 UK Census figure of 266.

References

External links

Villages in the East Riding of Yorkshire
Holderness
Civil parishes in the East Riding of Yorkshire